Anoplius aethiops is a species of spider wasp in the family Pompilidae.

References

External links

 

Pompilinae
Articles created by Qbugbot